Hellange is a small town in the commune of Frisange, in southern Luxembourg.  , the town has a population of 606.

Frisange
Towns in Luxembourg